Dragon Bay is a natural bay in Newfoundland, Canada. Indrafts include Mooring Cove, Willis Cove, Tickle Cove, and Crew Cove. It is narrow and deep throughout, with no anchorage. The south point of the entrance to this bay is Red Rock, the north point is Gray Rock, which has a cave.

References
Notes

Sources
 Atlas of Canada
 This article includes text incorporated from United States Hydrographic Office & R. G. Davenport's "Newfoundland and Labrador: The coast and banks of Newfoundland and the coast of Labrador, from Grand Point to the Koksoak River, with the adjacent islands and banks" (1884), a publication now in the public domain.

Bays of Newfoundland and Labrador